This is a list of countries ranked by public (government) spending per student in tertiary education as relative to GDP per capita. This amount is relative and does not indicate the absolute level of public spending on higher education.

References 

Education
Higher education by country
Higher education-related lists